This article presents a list of the historical events and publications of Australian literature during 1960.

Events 

 The first Adelaide Writers' Week was held as part of the Adelaide Festival of Arts.

Major publications

Books 
 Thea Astley – A Descant for Gossips
 Russell Braddon – The Proud American Boy
 Nancy Cato – Green Grows the Vine
 Jon Cleary – North from Thursday
 Charmian Clift – Walk to the Paradise Gardens
 Nino Culotta – Cop this Lot
 Catherine Gaskin – Corporation Wife
 Elizabeth Harrower – The Catherine Wheel
 George Johnston – Closer to the Sun
 Elizabeth O'Conner – The Irishman
 Nevil Shute – Trustee from the Toolroom
 Arthur Upfield – Valley of Smugglers
Joan Lindsay –  Picnic at Hanging Rock (novel)

Short stories 
 James Aldridge – Gold and Sand : Stories
 Ion Idriess – The Wild North
 John Morrison – "Dog-Box"
 Hal Porter – "Party 42 and Mrs Brewer"

Children's and Young Adult fiction 
 James Aldridge – The Shark Cage
 Nan Chauncy – Tangara
 John Gunn
 The Humpy in the Hills
 Peter Kent's Command
 Elyne Mitchell – Silver Brumby's Daughter
 Eleanor Spence – Lillipilly Hill
 Judith Wright – The Day the Mountains Played
 Patricia Wrightson – The Rocks of Honey

Poetry 

 Christopher Brennan – The Verse of Christopher Brennan, edited by A. R. Chisholm and John Joseph Quinn
 David Campbell
 "Town Planning"
 "Under the Wattles"
 "Windy Nights"
 Rosemary Dobson – "Ghost Town : New England"
 Geoffrey Dutton – Night Fishing
 R. D. Fitzgerald – "Bog and Candle"
 Gwen Harwood
 "The Glass-Jar"
 "Group from Tartarus"
 A. D. Hope
 "The Coasts of Cerrigo"
 Poems
 Colin Thiele – Man in a Landscape
 Judith Wright – Australian Bird Poems

Drama 
 Alan Seymour – The One Day of the Year

Awards and honours

Literary

Children and Young Adult

Poetry

Births 

A list, ordered by date of birth (and, if the date is either unspecified or repeated, ordered alphabetically by surname) of births in 1960 of Australian literary figures, authors of written works or literature-related individuals follows, including year of death.

 4 August – Tim Winton, novelist
 9 November – Michael Robotham, novelist

Unknown date
 Pamela Freeman, novelist
 Margo Lanagan, novelist and short story writer
 Fiona McIntosh, novelist

Deaths 

A list, ordered by date of death (and, if the date is either unspecified or repeated, ordered alphabetically by surname) of deaths in 1960 of Australian literary figures, authors of written works or literature-related individuals follows, including year of birth.

 12 January – Nevil Shute, novelist (born 1899)
 14 June – E. V. Timms, novelist (born 1895)

See also 
 1960 in Australia
 1960 in literature
1960 in poetry
List of years in Australian literature
List of years in literature

References

 
Australian literature by year
20th-century Australian literature
1960 in literature